Leo E. Green (born March 27, 1932) is an American politician in the state of Maryland. He served in the Maryland State Senate from 1983 to 2007 as a Democrat. Green attended Mount St. Mary's College and Georgetown University School of Law and is an attorney. He also served as mayor of Bowie, Maryland from 1968 to 1972.

References

Living people
Maryland Democrats
1932 births